Hanako (c. 1751 – July 7, 1977) was a scarlet koi fish owned by several individuals, the last of whom was Dr. Komei Koshihara. The name  translates to "flower child" in Japanese. Far exceeding the average lifespan for her breed, she was reportedly 226 years old at the time of her death. Her age was determined in 1966 by removing two of her scales and examining them extensively. Once the scales were fully analyzed, it was determined that she was 215 years old. In July 1974, a study of the growth rings of one of the koi's scales reported that Hanako was 226 years old. She may be, to date, the longest-lived koi fish ever recorded. There has been a dispute as to the veracity of these longevity claims.

The average koi bred outside of Japan can be expected to reach 15 years of age, while the average Japanese koi's lifespan is 40 years. Some sources give an accepted age for the species at little more than 50 years.

See also
List of longest-living organisms

References

External links
The story of Hanako the koi lived to an age of 226 years

Carp
1977 animal deaths
Individual fish